Yongin FS is the South Korean futsal club based in Yongin, Gyeonggi-do. The club was founded in November 2009.

Name History
 2009 : Founded as Yongin TMT Futsal Club
 2010 : Renamed Yongin FutSal

Honors
 FK Cup
 Runners-up (1) : 2011

References

Futsal clubs in South Korea
Sport in Gyeonggi Province
Futsal clubs established in 2009
2009 establishments in South Korea
Sport in Yongin